Vivian Dennis Busby (born 19 June 1949) is an English former professional footballer and manager. He played for Wycombe Wanderers, Luton Town, Newcastle United, Fulham Norwich City, Stoke City, Sheffield United, Tulsa Roughnecks, Blackburn Rovers and York City.

Playing career
Born in Slough, Buckinghamshire, Busby started his playing career at Wycombe Wanderers in 1966, but was unable to hold down a regular place in their team, despite his emerging talent. He moved to Luton Town in January 1970. At Kenilworth Road Busby scored four goals in his first nine matches helping the club gain promotion to the Second Division in 1969–70. He scored eight goals in 1970–71 but struggled to find form in 1971–72 and spent time out on loan at Newcastle United. He was sold to Fulham in August 1973 where he had the most prolific spell of his career. He scored 12 goals in 1973–74 and 18 in 1974–75 of which six were in the FA Cup helping Fulham reach the 1975 FA Cup Final, losing 2–0 against West Ham United. After scoring 38 goals in 155 matches for the Cottagers, he moved to First Division Norwich City where he made a fine start, scoring 11 goals in his first 18 matches for the Canaries, including a hat-trick against Leicester City on New Year's Day 1977.

However, he fell out of favour in 1977–78 and moved on to Stoke City. He was never a prolific goalscorer at the Victoria Ground but made up for it with his effort in 1978–79, helping Stoke gain promotion to the First Division. He scored 12 goals for Stoke in 60 matches and spent a short time out on loan at Sheffield United before moving to the United States to play for Tulsa Roughnecks. He stayed in Tulsa, Oklahoma for the 1980 North American Soccer League season before returning to England with Blackburn Rovers and then ended his playing career with York City.

Managerial and coaching career
Busby worked as a coach at York City between 1982 and 1987. Busby became manager of Hartlepool United on 15 February 1993 and left the position on 24 November 1993. Busby had been youth-team coach at Swindon Town, where he suffered a six-month battle against leukaemia. He was named as assistant manager at York City in September 2004. Busby was placed as caretaker manager at York City in November 2004 following the sacking of Chris Brass. He left his position as caretaker manager at York by mutual consent on 10 February 2005, when he was replaced by Billy McEwan. Busby worked as Youth Academy Manager at Gretna, but left after a change to the backroom staff. He was appointed as assistant manager at Workington in September 2007. He left in October 2011 to emigrate to Spain.

Personal life
He is the older brother of former Queens Park Rangers midfielder Martyn Busby.

Career statistics
Source:

A.  The "Other" column constitutes appearances and goals in the Anglo-Italian Cup, Anglo-Scottish Cup, Watney Cup.

Managerial statistics

Honours
Luton Town
Football League Third Division runner-up:  1969–70

Fulham
FA Cup runner-up: 1975
Anglo-Scottish Cup runner-up: 1975–76

Stoke City
Football League Second Division third-place promotion: 1978–79

York City
Football League Fourth Division champion: 1983–84

References

External links

 

1949 births
Living people
Sportspeople from Slough
English footballers
Association football forwards
Wycombe Wanderers F.C. players
Luton Town F.C. players
Newcastle United F.C. players
Fulham F.C. players
Norwich City F.C. players
Stoke City F.C. players
Sheffield United F.C. players
Tulsa Roughnecks (1978–1984) players
Blackburn Rovers F.C. players
York City F.C. players
Isthmian League players
English Football League players
North American Soccer League (1968–1984) players
English football managers
Hartlepool United F.C. managers
York City F.C. managers
English Football League managers
National League (English football) managers
York City F.C. non-playing staff
English expatriate sportspeople in the United States
Expatriate soccer players in the United States
English expatriate footballers
FA Cup Final players
Footballers from Berkshire